Robert Ellington Dixon (April 22, 1906 – October 21, 1981) was a United States Navy admiral and aviator, whose radio message "Scratch one flat top" during the Battle of the Coral Sea became quickly famous, as his unit of dive bombers contributed to the first sinking of a Japanese aircraft carrier in the Pacific theater of the Second World War. Dixon would go on to serve on four other carriers during the war and commanded  during the Korean War. Dixon was a 1927 graduate of the U. S. Naval Academy. He was awarded two Navy Crosses.  The first was awarded for scouting operations against Japanese forces over Lae and Salamaua, New Guinea in March 1942 

The second Navy Cross was awarded for his success in the Battle of the Coral Sea. He also received three Legions of Merit: (1) for airstrikes against the Buka-Bonis area, Bougainville, and at Rabaul in November 1943; as commanding officer of the USS Valley Forge from January to June 1953; and (3) for services as Chief, Bureau of Aeronautics from July 1957 to November 1959. 

Promoted to rear admiral on July 1, 1955, Dixon served as Assistant Chief for Plans and Programs at the Bureau of Aeronautics. As Assistant Chief, he was responsible for all development work on the new McDonnell Douglas F-4 Phantom II jet fighter. Dixon later served as Chief of the Bureau from July 1957 to November 1959.

He died on October 21, 1981 at the age of 75 at Virginia Beach, and was later buried at Woodlawn Memorial Gardens at Norfolk, Virginia.

References

1906 births
1981 deaths
United States Naval Academy alumni
United States Naval Aviators
United States Navy personnel of World War II
Recipients of the Navy Cross (United States)
United States Navy personnel of the Korean War
United States Navy rear admirals
Recipients of the Legion of Merit